The  is a professional golf tournament held in the Kansai region of Japan. Founded in 1926, one year before the Japan Open Golf Championship, it was the first professional tournament to be organised in Japan. It was an event on the Japan Golf Tour from 1973 to 1991 and has been back on the tour schedule since 2009. The 2019 event was the 85th edition.

Winners

References

External links
 
Coverage on Japan Golf Tour's official site

Japan Golf Tour events
Golf tournaments in Japan
Recurring sporting events established in 1926
1926 establishments in Japan